The northern crested newt, great crested newt or warty newt (Triturus cristatus) is a newt species native to Great Britain, northern and central continental Europe and parts of Western Siberia. Its back and sides are dark brown, while the belly is yellow to orange with dark blotches. Males develop a conspicuous jagged crest on their back and tail during the breeding season.

The northern crested newt spends most of the year on land, mainly in forested areas in lowlands. It moves to aquatic breeding sites, mainly larger fish-free ponds, in spring. Males court females with a ritualised display and deposit a spermatophore on the ground, which the female then picks up with her cloaca. After fertilisation, a female lays around 200 eggs, folding them into water plants. The larvae develop over two to four months before metamorphosing into terrestrial juveniles (efts). Both larvae and land-dwelling newts mainly feed on different invertebrates.

Several of the northern crested newt's former subspecies are now recognised as separate species in the genus Triturus. Its closest relative is the Danube crested newt (T. dobrogicus). It sometimes forms hybrids with some of its relatives, including the marbled newt (T. marmoratus). Although today the most widespread Triturus species, the northern crested newt was probably confined to small refugial areas in the Carpathians during the Last Glacial Maximum.

While the International Union for Conservation of Nature lists it as Least Concern species, populations of the northern crested newt have been declining. The main threat is habitat destruction, for example, through urban sprawl. The species is listed as a European Protected Species.

Taxonomy

The northern crested newt was described as Triton cristatus by Josephus Nicolaus Laurenti in 1768. As Linnaeus had already used the name Triton for a genus of sea snails ten years before, Constantine Samuel Rafinesque introduced the new genus name Triturus in 1815, with T. cristatus as type species.

Over 40 scientific names introduced over time are now considered as synonyms, including Lacertus aquatilis, a nomen oblitum published four years before Laurenti's species name. Hybrids resulting from the cross of a crested newt male with a marbled newt (Triturus marmoratus) female were mistakenly described as distinct species Triton blasii, and the reverse hybrids as Triton trouessarti.

T. cristatus was long considered as a single species, the "crested newt", with several subspecies. Substantial genetic differences between these subspecies were, however, noted and eventually led to their recognition as full species, often collectively referred to as "T. cristatus species complex". There are now seven accepted species of crested newts, of which the northern crested newt is the most widespread.

Description

The northern crested newt is a relatively large newt species. Rare individuals of  have been recorded. Other crested newt species are more stockily built; only the Danube crested newt (T. dobrogicus) is more slender. Body shape is correlated with skeletal build: The northern crested newt has 15 rib-bearing vertebrae, only the Danube crested newt has more (16–17), while the other, more stocky Triturus species have 14 or less.

The newts have rough skin, and are dark brown on the back and sides, with black spots and heavy white stippling on the flanks. The female has a yellow line running along the lower tail edge. The throat is mixed yellow–black with fine white stippling, the belly yellow to orange with dark, irregular blotches.

It is heavily indented on the back but smoother on the tail. Also during breeding season, the male's cloaca swells and it has a blue–white flash running along the sides of the tail. Females do not develop a crest.

Range

The northern crested newt is the most widespread and northerly crested newt species. The northern edge of its range runs from Great Britain through southern Fennoscandia to the Republic of Karelia in Russia; the southern margin runs through central France, southwest Romania, Moldavia and Ukraine, heading from there into central Russia and through the Ural Mountains. The eastern extent of the great crested newt's range reaches into Western Siberia, running from the Perm Krai to the Kurgan Oblast.

In western France, the species co-occurs and sometimes hybridises (see section Evolution below) with the marbled newt (Triturus marmoratus). In southeast Europe, its range borders that of the Italian crested newt (T. carnifex), the Danube crested newt (T. dobrogicus),  the Macedonian crested newt (T. macedonicus) and the Balkan crested newt (T. ivanbureschi).

Habitat

Outside of the breeding season, northern crested newts are mainly forest-dwellers. They prefer deciduous woodlands or groves, but conifer woods are also accepted, especially in the far northern and southern ranges. In the absence of forests, other cover-rich habitats, as for example hedgerows, scrub, swampy meadows, or quarries, can be inhabited.

Preferred aquatic breeding sites are stagnant, mid- to large-sized, unshaded water bodies with abundant underwater vegetation but without fish (which prey on larvae). Typical examples are larger ponds, which need not be of natural origin; indeed, most ponds inhabited in the United Kingdom are human-made. Examples of other suitable secondary habitats are ditches, channels, gravel pit lakes, or garden ponds. Other newts that can sometimes be found in the same breeding sites are the smooth newt (Lissotriton vulgaris), the palmate newt (L. helveticus), the Carpathian newt (L. montadoni), the alpine newt (Ichthyosaura alpestris) and the marbled newt (Triturus marmoratus).

Population structure, speciation, and phylogeny

Hybridization 
In certain areas of France, the northern crested newt and the marbled newt overlap, and hybrids are present. As the northern crested newt's population grows, and marbled newt population struggles, these hybrids have been shown to possess good qualities of both. They have more fecundity than the two newts however have a hard time keeping their eggs alive.

Life cycle and behaviour

Like other newts, T. cristatus develops in the water as a larva and returns to the water each year for breeding. Adults spend around seven months of the year on land. After larval development in the first year, juveniles pass another year or two before reaching maturity; in the north and at higher elevations, this can take longer. The larval and juvenile stages are the riskiest for the newts, while survival is higher in adults. Once the risky stages passed, adult newts usually have a lifespan of seven to nine years, although individuals have reached 17 years in the wild.

Adult newts begin moving to their breeding sites in spring when temperatures stay above , usually in March. In the aquatic phase, crested newts are mostly nocturnal and, compared to smaller newt species, usually prefer the deeper parts of a water body, where they hide under vegetation. As with other newts, they have to occasionally move to the surface to breathe air. The aquatic phase serves not only for reproduction, but also offers more abundant prey, and immature crested newts frequently return to the water in spring even if they do not breed.

During the terrestrial phase, the newts use hiding places such as logs, bark, planks, stone walls, or small mammal burrows; several individuals may occupy such refuges at the same time. Since the newts generally stay very close to their aquatic breeding sites, the quality of the surrounding terrestrial habitat largely determines whether an otherwise suitable water body will be colonised. Great crested newts may also climb vegetation during their terrestrial phase, although the exact function of this behaviour is not known at present.

The juvenile efts often disperse to new breeding sites, while the adults in general move back to the same breeding sites each year. Over most of their range, they hibernate in winter, using mainly subterranean hiding places, where many individuals will often congregate.

Diet and predators

Northern crested newts feed mainly on invertebrates. During the land phase, prey include earthworms and other annelids, different insects, woodlice, and snails and slugs. During the breeding season, they prey on various aquatic invertebrates (such as molluscs, microcrustaceans, and insects), and also tadpoles of other amphibians such as the common frog or common toad, and smaller newts. Larvae, depending on their size, eat small invertebrates and tadpoles, and also smaller larvae of their own species.

The larvae are themselves eaten by various animals such as carnivorous invertebrates and water birds, and are especially vulnerable to predatory fish. Adults generally avoid predators through their hidden lifestyle but are sometimes eaten by herons and other birds, snakes such as the grass snake, and mammals such as shrews, badgers and hedgehogs. They secrete the poison tetrodotoxin from their skin, albeit much less than for example the North American Pacific newts (Taricha). The bright yellow or orange underside of crested newts is a warning coloration which can be presented in case of perceived danger. In such a posture, the newts typically roll up and secrete a milky substance.

Courtship and reproduction

Northern crested newts, like their relatives in the genus Triturus, perform a complex courtship display, where the male attracts a female through specific body movements and waves pheromones to her. The males are territorial and use small patches of clear ground as leks, or courtship arenas. When successful, they guide the female over a spermatophore they deposit on the ground, which she then takes up with her cloaca.

The eggs are fertilised internally, and the female deposits them individually, usually folding them into leaves of aquatic plants. A female takes around five minutes for the deposition of one egg. They usually lay around 200 eggs per season. Embryos are usually light-coloured, 1.8–2 mm in diameter with a 6 mm jelly capsule, which distinguishes them from eggs of other co-existing newt species that are smaller and darker-coloured. A genetic particularity shared with other Triturus species causes 50% of the embryos to die.

Larvae hatch after two to five weeks, depending on temperature. As in all salamanders and newts, forelimbs develop first, followed later by the back legs. Unlike smaller newts, crested newt larvae are mostly nektonic, swimming freely in the water column. Metamorphosis into terrestrial efts takes place two to four months after hatching, again depending on temperature. Survival of larvae from hatching to metamorphosis has been estimated at a mean of roughly 4%. In unfavourable conditions, larvae may delay their development and overwinter in water, although this seems to be less common than in the small-bodied newts.

Evolution

The northern crested newt sometimes hybridises with other crested newt species where their ranges meet, but overall, the different species are reproductively isolated. In a case study in the Netherlands, genes of the introduced Italian crested newt (T. carnifex) were found to introgress into the gene pool of the native northern crested newt. The closest relative of the northern crested newt, according to molecular phylogenetic analyses, is the Danube crested newt (T. dobrogicus).

In western France, the northern crested newt's range overlaps with that of the marbled newt (T. marmoratus), but the two species in general prefer different habitats. When they do occur in the same breeding ponds, they can form hybrids, which have intermediate characteristics. Hybrids resulting from the cross of a crested newt male with a marbled newt female are much rarer due to increased mortality of the larvae and consist only of males. In the reverse cross, males have lower survival rates than females. Overall, viability is reduced in these hybrids and they rarely backcross with their parent species. Hybrids made up 3–7% of the adult populations in different studies.

Little genetic variation was found over most of the species' range, except in the Carpathians. This suggests that the Carpathians was a refugium during the Last Glacial Maximum. The northern crested newt then expanded its range north-, east- and westwards when the climate rewarmed.

Threats and conservation

The northern crested newt is listed as species of Least Concern on the IUCN Red List, but populations are declining. It is rare in some parts of its range and listed in several national red lists.

The major reason for decline is habitat destruction through urban and agricultural development, affecting the aquatic breeding sites as well as the land habitats. Their limited dispersal makes the newts especially vulnerable to fragmentation, i.e. the loss of connections for exchange between suitable habitats. Other threats include the introduction of fish and crayfish into breeding ponds, collection for the pet trade in its eastern range, warmer and wetter winters due to global warming, genetic pollution through hybridisation with other, introduced crested newt species, the use of road salt, and potentially the pathogenic fungus Batrachochytrium salamandrivorans.

The northern crested newt is listed in Berne Convention Appendix II as "strictly protected". It is also included in Annex II (species requiring designation of special areas of conservation) and IV (species in need of strict protection) of the EU habitats and species directive, as a European Protected Species. As required by these frameworks, its capture, disturbance, killing or trade, as well as the destruction of its habitats, are prohibited in most European countries. The EU habitats directive is also the basis for the Natura 2000 protected areas, several of which have been designated specifically to protect the northern crested newt.

Preservation of natural water bodies, reduction of fertiliser and pesticide use, control or eradication of introduced predatory fish, and the connection of habitats through sufficiently wide corridors of uncultivated land are seen as effective conservation actions. A network of aquatic habitats in proximity is important to sustain populations, and the creation of new breeding ponds is in general very effective as they are rapidly colonised when other habitats are nearby. In some cases, entire populations have been moved when threatened by development projects, but such translocations need to be carefully planned to be successful.

Strict protection of the northern crested newt in the United Kingdom has created conflicts with local development projects, but the species is also seen as a flagship species, whose conservation also benefits a range of other amphibians. Government agencies have issued specific guidelines for the mitigation of development impacts.

References 

Triturus
Amphibians of Europe
Fauna of the United Kingdom
Amphibians described in 1768
Taxa named by Josephus Nicolaus Laurenti
Articles containing video clips